The 1945–46 Serie C was a special edition of Serie C, the third highest league in the Italian football league system. Best clubs of Northern Italy were admitted as special guests into the 1945–46 Serie B-C Alta Italia.

Legend

Northern Italy
Northern Italy sides were divided in several rounds (gironi). The winners qualified to a tournament to determine the only team promoted to 1946–47 Serie B.  None of the teams relegated.

Girone A
Venezia Giulia

Girone B
Eastern Veneto

Girone C
Western Veneto

Girone D - Piedmont

Girone D - Liguria

Girone E
Northern Lombardy

Girone F
Western Lombardy

Girone G
Eastern Lombardy

Girone H
Southern Lombardy

Girone I
Emilia

Semifinals

Girone A

Girone B

Final

Mestrina promoted to 1946–47 Serie B.

Central and Southern Italy
All the winners of the rounds (gironi) were promoted to 1946–47 Serie B; however, clubs participating as special guests could not be promoted. Later other teams were admitted to Serie B to create a southern round.

Girone A
Tuscany

Girone B
Umbria and Marche

Girone C
Lazio and Abruzzo

Girone D
Campania and Basilicata

Girone E
Apulia

Girone F
Calabria and Sicily

Footnotes 

Serie C seasons
3
Italy